Gomme is a traditional Norwegian dish usually served as a spread or a dessert.

Gomme is commonly a form of sweet cheese made of long-boiled milk and having a yellow or brown colour. It is can be used as a cheese spread on slices of bread, lefse, or waffles. There are several regional and local variants. There also exists a porridge-like variant made of boiled milk with oat grain or rice. It can be served as a dessert with vanilla, cardamom, raisins, and cinnamon as added ingredients in most variants. The consistency can vary from soft to thick.

See also
 List of porridges

References

Other sources
Diehl, Kari Schoening (2012) The Everything Nordic Cookbook (Quarto - Everything Books)

Related reading
 Moe, Nils Harald (2002) Tradisjonsmat fra nord (Tromsø: Vitus forlag) 
 Notaker, Henry (1993) Ganens makt: norsk kokekunst og matkultur gjennom tusen år(Oslo: Aschehoug) 

Norwegian cuisine
Dairy products
Cheese dishes
Spreads (food)